{{Automatic taxobox
| image = Senecio suaveolens - Sweet Scented Indian Plantain.jpg
| image_caption = 'Hasteola suaveolens| display_parents = 2
| taxon = Hasteola
| authority = Raf.
| synonyms_ref = 
| synonyms = * Synosma Raf. ex Britton & A.Br.
}}Hasteola is a genus of flowering plants in the daisy family, Asteraceae.

 Species
 Hasteola kamtschatica (Maxim.) Pojark. - Russian Far East, northeastern China, Korea
 Hasteola praetermissa Poljakov - Russian Far East
 Hasteola robertiorum L.C.Anderson - Florida
 Hasteola robusta (Tolm.) Pojark. - Japan, Kuril Islands, Sakhalin
 Hasteola suaveolens (L.) Pojark. - eastern United States
 Hasteola tschonoskii'' (Koidz.) Pojark. - China, Korea, Mongolia

References

Senecioneae
Asteraceae genera
Taxa named by Constantine Samuel Rafinesque